Epangala Lukose (born 20 April 1964) is a retired Congolese football defender. He was a squad member at the 1992, 1994 and 1996 Africa Cup of Nations.

References

1964 births
Living people
Democratic Republic of the Congo footballers
Democratic Republic of the Congo international footballers
1992 African Cup of Nations players
1994 African Cup of Nations players
1996 African Cup of Nations players
AS Vita Club players
Association football defenders
AS Vita Club managers
21st-century Democratic Republic of the Congo people